= Stephen Ruane =

Stephen Ruane (fl. 1906–12) was a farmer and Irish piper.

A native of Shantalla, Galway, Ruane's career was resurrected by the Gaelic League early in the 20th century after many years of neglect. He attended the Dublin Feis of 1906, winning the first prize. He participated in the Feis of 1912 but was let down by a badly tuned instrument.
